William Stobart (born November 1961) is the Deputy Group CEO of Culina Group (owner of the Eddie Stobart Group).

Career
Stobart was born in Cumberland in England in November 1961, the fourth child of Eddie and Nora Stobart.  He worked for the family business from his teenage years, joining the management of Eddie Stobart Ltd in 1986. Stobart was Chief Operating Officer of the Stobart Group from 2007 to 2014 and Chief Executive Officer of Eddie Stobart Logistics from 2014 to 2017. He then served as Executive Chairman of GreenWhiteStar Acquisitions from 2019 to 2021 and became Deputy Group CEO of Culina Group in 2021.

References

1961 births
Living people
21st-century English businesspeople
People from Cumbria
People from the Borough of Cheshire East
British chief executives
Chief operating officers